Samborondón is a canton in Ecuador’s Guayas province. It has 105 localities and two urban parishes (La Puntilla) and Samborondón Town (Cabecera cantonal) and one rural parish (Tarifa). La Puntilla's parish is one of the most exclusive residential and entertainment districts in Ecuador. It has many Gated Communities (urbanizaciones cerradas), and several retail developments are located in the suburb. Its close proximity to the country's second-largest city, Guayaquil (merely crossing a bridge), allows many of its residents to work there. Most of the upper-class families in Guayaquil live at La Puntilla's Parish in Samborondón.

History
Samborondón was founded on May 24, 1776 and achieved its independence on October 10, 1820. Since October 31, 1955 the suburb has been a canton.

The name Samborondón comes from Saint Brendan, in Spanish San Borondón. The name of the Saint was commonly used in Spain and subsequently in Latin America for towns and villages.
The name Samborondón, in general usage, often refers to the rich downtown area of the canton called
La Puntilla. In fact, Samborondón consists of a much larger area than just La Puntilla, which is a peninsula between the rivers Babahoyo and Daule (where the River Guayas is formed).

Health care
A new branch of the Kennedy Hospital, a private hospital chain, was finished in 2007 and is now in use. There are also a few building complexes specially built for medical practices.

Shopping and entertainment
The local shopping center, Riocentro Entrerios has many retail stores, a hypermarket, a food court, and a cinema.
The Village Plaza was inaugurated in August 2010. A hypermarket from the Supermaxi chain and other 90 stores have been announced.
Bocca, La Piazza, La Torre, Las Terrazas, Plaza Lagos, Alhambra, Piazza,  and Plaza Navona are smaller shopping centers, mainly around exclusive restaurants, gyms, nightclubs and stores.

One of the best theaters in Ecuador is Teatro Sánchez Aguilar, is also in this area.

Tourism
The Parque Histórico, a botanical garden and zoo of the local fauna and flora with reconstructions of historical buildings, is one of the main tourist attractions of Guayaquil.

Samborondón has a hotel boutique, Orilla del Rio, located in Entrerios. Its proximity to Guayaquil (5 minutes by car, pedestrian access prohibited on the bridge) makes this unproblematic for a visitor, except on peak hours (7–8 a.m. and 4–7 p.m.)

Samborondón is also home to the most exclusive nightclubs in Greater Guayaquil and there are three restaurants-complex with luxurious and innovative cuisine, that otherwise are not found in the city.

Education
Due to the increasing growth of the area, many schools have relocated or established branch campuses from Guayaquil and Quito to Samborondón. Most of them are exclusive private schools, among them Colegio Menor, Abdón Calderón, Torremar and Delta (belonging to Opus Dei), Nuevo Mundo, Liceo Panamericano, Moderna Sergio Pérez Valdez, Centro Educativo Naciones Unidas, La Moderna, CREAR and Monte Tabor. The German School Guayaquil inaugurated a second Kindergarten in Samborondón on April 13, 2009. There are 23 public elementary schools in the Canton.

The first university located in the suburb was the Universidad de Especialidades Espíritu Santo, which opened its doors on 1994. Another university, Ecotec has relocated to the suburb. Since 2000 the ESPOL (Technical University of the littoral) has an annex called PROTCOM in Samborondón, though it only offers 2 courses, leading to a technical associate degree.

Gallery

References

 www.inec.gov.ec

External links

 Local government of Samborondón
 University UEES
 
 Article of the Friedrich Ebert Foundation about the impact of the new city concept of security on young wealthy people from Samborondón (Spanish)
 Parque Histórico de Guayaquil (spanish)
 Jose 'Coco' Yunez Campaign page

Populated places in Guayas Province